Erste Rollhockey Gemeinschaft Iserlohn e.V. is a Roller Hockey team from Iserlohn, Germany. Founded in 1965, both men's and women's team play in the Bundesliga.

Trophies

Men's team
 Bundesliga: (9)
 1976, 1977, 1986, 2006, 2008, 2009, 2015, 2016, 2017
 German Cup: 5
 2004, 2005, 2009, 2011, 2012

Women's team
 Bundesliga: (7)
 2012, 2013, 2014, 2015, 2016, 2017, 2018
 German Cup: (5)
 2012, 2014, 2015, 2016, 2017

External links
Official Website

Roller hockey clubs in Germany
Sports clubs established in 1965
1965 establishments in Germany